Eternity is an album by Alice Coltrane. It was recorded in August through October, 1975, and was released in 1976 by Warner Records, her first release with the label. On the album, Coltrane is joined by ensembles of varying size. It was Coltrane's first album following both her move to California and her decision to become a monastic.

Reception

In a review for AllMusic, Thom Jurek praised Coltrane's "ability to open up her own sonic vocabulary and seamlessly create an ensemble context for to deliver an unpredictable expression of her vision of harmonic convergence," and wrote: "Eternity is ultimately about the universality of tonal language and its complex expressions. It is an enduring recording that was far ahead of its time in 1976 and is only now getting the recognition it deserves."

The authors of The Penguin Guide to Jazz Recordings awarded the album a full 4 stars, and called it "an unexpectedly good introduction to Turiya's musical philosophy."

Writing for WQXR, James Bennett II commented: "listening to Eternity feels like one is putting in effortless meditative work... Across these six tracks there is a unifying theme: the journey... Each piece is trying to find itself — the music isn't wandering because it's lost. Coltrane has acted with intention, urging each musical element towards discovery so that it may find what it really is, and soundly rest in the security of that knowledge."

Jennifer Lucy Allan of The Guardian stated that the album is "short and lacks the coherence of her other releases," but praised "Spiritual Eternal", writing: "the huge Wurlitzer solo swaddled in strings, like the theme tune to someone parading down a palatial staircase in a silken gown... What swing! What elegance!"

In an article for Spectrum Culture, Daniel Bromfield noted that the album was "experimental in terms of Coltrane putting her new tools to the test on wax for the first time," but remarked: "It's meant to be a Sketches of Spain sort of thing, but... that organ sound is better when it does the bulk of the sonic load-bearing."

Phyl Garland of Ebony commented: "Much of the music here is infused with the ethereal quality we have come to expect of her... But though her head is to the sky, her feet seem to be more firmly planted in earthly melodies than on some other efforts."

The Vinyl District's Joseph Neff stated that Coltrane's playing is "as gorgeous as ever," and noted that "the record's most impressive quality lies in how seamlessly everything unwinds, the flow serving to nicely deflate the theory that this strain of '70s progressive jazz was unfocused and undisciplined."

Track list
 "Spiritual Eternal" – 2:57	
 "Wisdom Eye" – 3:10	
 "Los Caballos" – 11:27
 "Om Supreme" – 9:28	
 "Morning Worship" – 3:36
 "Spring Rounds" (excerpted from The Rite Of Spring by Igor Stravinsky) – 5:59

Personnel

Track 1
 Alice Coltrane – organ
 Fred Jackson – flute
 Hubert Laws – flute
 Jerome Richardson – soprano saxophone
 Jackie Kelso – tenor saxophone
 Terry Harrington – tenor saxophone
 Don Christlieb – bassoon
 Jack Marsh – bassoon
 Oscar Brashear – trumpet
 Paul Hubinon – trumpet
 Charlie Loper – trombone
 George Bohanon – trombone
 Alan Robinson – French horn
 Marylin Robinson – French horn
 Tommy Johnson – tuba
 Gordon Marron – violin
 Murray Adler – violin
 Nathan Kaproff – violin
 Polly Sweeney – violin
 Sid Sharp – violin
 Bill Kurasch – violin
 Mike Nowack – viola
 Pamela Goldsmith – viola
 Rollice Dale – viola
 Anne Goodman – cello
 Jackie Lustgarten – cello
 Ray Kelley – cello
 Charlie Haden – bass
 Ben Riley – drums

Track 2
 Alice Coltrane – harp

Track 3
 Alice Coltrane – organ
 Charlie Haden – bass
 Ben Riley – drums
 Armando Peraza – congas

Track 4
 Alice Coltrane – electric piano
 Deborah Coomer – vocals
 Edward Cansino – vocals
 Jean Packer – vocals
 Paul Vorwerk – vocals
 Susan Judy – vocals
 William Yeomans – vocals
 Carlos Santana – timbales

Track 5
 Alice Coltrane – organ, tambura
 Charlie Haden – bass
 Ben Riley – drums
 Armando Peraza – congas
 Carlos Santana – percussion
 Ed Michel – bells

Track 6
 Alice Coltrane – organ, timpani, cymbal
 Louise Di Tullio – piccolo
 Fred Jackson – flute
 Hubert Laws – flute
 Jerome Richardson – alto flute
 Jackie Kelso – clarinet
 Terry Harrington – clarinet
 Julian Spear – bass clarinet
 Gene Cipriano – oboe
 John Ellis – oboe
 Ernie Watts – English horn
 Don Christlieb – bassoon
 Jack Marsh – bassoon
 Jo Ann Caldwell – contrabassoon
 Oscar Brashear – trumpet
 Paul Hubinon – trumpet
 Charlie Loper – trombone
 George Bohanon – trombone
 Alan Robinson – French horn
 Art Maebe – French horn
 Marylin Robinson – French horn
 Vince De Rosa – French horn
 Tommy Johnson – tuba
 Gordon Marron – violin
 Murray Adler – violin
 Nathan Kaproff – violin
 Polly Sweeney – violin
 Sid Sharp – violin
 Bill Kurasch – violin
 Mike Nowack – viola
 Pamela Goldsmith – viola
 Rollice Dale – viola
 Anne Goodman – cello
 Jackie Lustgarten – cello
 Ray Kelley – cello
 Charlie Haden – bass
 Ben Riley – bass, percussion, gong

References

1976 albums
Alice Coltrane albums
Warner Records albums